Kalungi Edward (born 12 October 1977) is a Ugandan retired international footballer who played as a defender for the Uganda national team   between 1993 and 2003.

Playing career
Kalungi played club football for Express FC (Uganda), Shinas F.C. (Oman), Hue F.C. (Vietnam), Look E San F.C. (Thailand), Al-Wasl F.C. (U.A.E), and Sulut United F.C. (Indonesia). He retired in 2010.

National team
Kalungi made his debut for the Uganda national team on 3 September 1993 against Tanzania. Kalungi scored his first goal for the Uganda national team on 23 November 2000 against the Somalia national team in the 2000 CECAFA Cup.

Post-football career
In 2013, Kalungi was elected as a delegate for Uganda Football Players Association. In December 2018, Kalungi was appointed as a FUFA staff as Head Of Estates Manager, a department overseeing football infrastructure in Uganda.

References

External links
  
Uganda national football team statistics and records: appearances

Living people
Uganda international footballers
Uganda Premier League players
V.League 1 players
Ugandan expatriate sportspeople in Vietnam
1977 births
Express FC players
Association football defenders
Expatriate footballers in Vietnam
Ugandan footballers
Sportspeople from Kampala